The Boston mayoral election of 2001 occurred on Tuesday, November 6, 2001, between incumbent mayor Thomas Menino and City Councilor Peggy Davis-Mullen. Menino was re-elected to a third term.

The nonpartisan municipal preliminary election was held on September 25, 2001. Davis-Mullen, by finishing second, became the second woman to be a finalist for mayor in city history.

Candidates
Thomas Menino, Mayor of Boston since 1993, Boston City Councilor from 1984 to 1993, and Council President in 1993.
Peggy Davis-Mullen, Boston City Councilor since 1994.

Candidates eliminated in preliminary
Althea Garrison, member of the Massachusetts House of Representatives from the 5th Suffolk District from 1993 to 1995.

Results

See also
List of mayors of Boston, Massachusetts

References

Mayoral election
Boston mayoral
Boston
Mayoral elections in Boston
Non-partisan elections
Boston mayoral election